Tiên Lữ is a rural district of Hưng Yên province in the Red River Delta region of Vietnam. As of 2003 the district had a population of 109,496. The district covers an area of 92 km². The district capital lies at Vương.

References

Districts of Hưng Yên province